Sasha Dugdale FRSL is a British poet, playwright and translator. She has written five poetry collections and is a translator of Russian literature.

Biography
Sasha Dugdale was born in 1974 in Sussex.  
   
Between 1995 and 2000, Dugdale worked for the British Council in Russia.

Dugdale has published five poetry collections with Carcanet Press: Notebook (2003), The Estate (2007), Red House (2011), Joy (2017) and Deformations (2020). She  won the Forward Poetry Prize for Best Single Poem, Joy in 2016 and a Cholmondeley Award in 2017.

Dugdale specialises in translating contemporary Russian women poets and post-Soviet new writing for theatre. She has worked both in the United Kingdom and the United States on a number of productions, translating  modern Russian plays. In 2020, she won an English PEN Translate Award for her translation of a collection of poetry by the Russian poet Maria Stepanova.

From 2012 to 2017 Dugdale was the editor of Modern Poetry in Translation, editing and publishing sixteen issues of the magazine as well as its fiftieth year anniversary anthology Centres of Cataclysm (Bloodaxe, 2016).  From 2015 to 2021 Dugdale directed the biennial Winchester Poetry Festival.

Her translation of Maria Stepanova's novel In Memory of Memory was shortlisted for the 2021 International Booker Prize, the 2022 Oxford-Weidenfeld Translation Prize, the 2022 James Tait Black Memorial Prize, and in 2021 was longlisted for the National Book Award for Translated Literature.

Publications

Poetry
(2020), Deformations, Carcanet Press, 
(2017), Joy, Carcanet Press, 
(2011), Red House, Oxford Poets, 
(2007), The Estate, Oxford Poets, 
(2003), Notebook, Oxford Poets,

Translations
(2021), Maria Stepanova, The War of the Beasts and the Animals, Bloodaxe, 
(2021), Maria Stepanova, In Memory of Memory, Fitzcarraldo Editions (UK), New Directions (US), 
(2017), Natalya Vorozhbit, Bad Roads, Nick Hern Books, 
(2009), Natalya Vorozhbit, The Grainstore, Nick Hern Books, 
(2008), Elena Shvarts, Birdsong on the Seabed, Bloodaxe, 
(2004), Vasily Sigarev, Ladybird, Nick Hern Books
(2004), Tatiana Shcherbina, Life Without: Selected Poetry & Prose 1992-2003, Bloodaxe, 
(2003), The Presnyakov Brothers, Terrorism, Nick Hern Books
(2003), The Presnyakov Brothers, Playing the Victim, Nick Hern Books, 
(2003), Vasily Sigarev, Black Milk, Nick Hern Books
(2002), Vasily Sigarev, Plasticine, Nick Hern Books,

Awards
— (2022), Lois Roth Award, In Memory of Memory
— (2020), T. S. Eliot Prize, Deformations, (shortlist) 
— (2017), Cholmondeley Award
— (2017), Poetry Book Society Choice - Joy
— (2016), Forward Poetry Prize for Best Single Poem, Joy
— (2003), Eric Gregory Award

References

1974 births
Living people
21st-century British poets
British women poets
People from Sussex
21st-century British women writers